The 2019–20 Rwanda Premier League was the 43rd season of the Rwanda Premier League, the top-tier football league in Rwanda. The season started on 4 October 2019.

The season was disrupted by the Covid-19 pandemic which forced games of round 24
to be played behind closed doors but before the round could be completed the league was abandoned on May 22. The standings after round 23 are considered final.

Teams
A total of 16 teams compete in the 2019–20 season with the top team qualifying for the CAF Champions League, the runner-ups qualifying for the CAF Confederation Cup and the bottom two relegated to the Rwandan Second Division.

League table

Results

Stadiums

References

Rwanda National Football League seasons
Premier League
Premier League
Rwanda